John Kotz (1930 – 11 November 2014) was a British Labour Party politician who became the mayor and leader of Hackney.  His autobiography was Vintage red.

References

Further reading

1930 births
2014 deaths
Labour Party (UK) councillors
Councillors in the London Borough of Hackney
Mayors of places in Greater London
Leaders of local authorities of England